The Plimpton Prize is an annual award of $10,000 given by The Paris Review to a previously unpublished or emerging author who has written a work of fiction that was recently published in its publication.

The award was named in honor of longtime editor of The Paris Review, George Plimpton, who died in 2003. The Plimpton Prize is funded by Sarah Plimpton, his widow, and Terry McDonell, president of the Paris Review Board of Directors.

Winners of the Plimpton Prize 

 1993: Macia Guthridge, for Bones
 1994: Vikram Chandra, for Dharma"
 1995: Lise Goett, for Three Poems
 1996: Elizabeth Gilbert, for The Famous Torn and Restored Lit Cigarette Trick
 1997: Martin McDonagh, for The Cripple of Inishmaan
 1998: Julie Orringer, for When She Is Old and I Am Famous
 1999: Daniel Libman, for In the Belly of the Cat
 2000: Karl Iagnemma, for On the Nature of Human Romantic Interaction
 2001: John Barlow, for Eating Mammals
 2002: Wells Tower, for The Brown Coast
 2003: Yiyun Li, for Immortality
 2004: Malinda McCollum, for The Fifth Wall
 2007: Benjamin Percy, for Refresh, Refresh
 2008: Jesse Ball, for The Early Deaths of Lubeck, Brennan, Harp, and Carr
 2009: Alistair Morgan, for Departure
 2010: Caitlin Horrocks, for At the Zoo
 2011: April Ayers Lawson, for Virgin
 2012: Amie Barrodale, for William Wei
 2013: Ottessa Moshfegh, for Disgust and Bettering Myself
 2014: Emma Cline, for Marion
 2015: Atticus Lish, for Preparation for the Next Life
 2016: David Szalay, for Youth and Lascia Amor e siegui Marte
 2017: Alexia Arthurs, for Bad Behavior
 2018: Isabella Hammad, for The Parisian
 2019: Kelli Jo Ford, for Hybrid Vigor
 2020: Jonathan Escoffery, for Under the Ackee Tree

References

American literary awards
English-language literary awards
Short story awards
The Paris Review